Daddy Di Do Du is a Philippine television situational comedy series broadcast by GMA Network. Directed by Bert de Leon, it stars Vic Sotto, Maxene Magalona, Danica Sotto and Isabella de Leon. It premiered on July 12, 2001 on the network's KiliTV line up replacing 1 for 3. The series concluded on July 29, 2007. It was replaced by Ful Haus in its timeslot.

Cast and characters

Lead cast
Vic Sotto as Hercules "Kul" Vallejo
Danica Sotto as Dinna Vallejo
Maxene Magalona as Donna Vallejo
Isabella de Leon as Duday Vallejo

Supporting cast
Cindy Kurleto as Greta
Redford White as Bruce
Ruby Rodriguez as Empee
Paolo Ballesteros as Paolo
Joonee Gamboa as Gener
Jose Manalo as Val
Sugar Mercado as Sugar
Rhian Ramos as Aileen
Nida Blanca as Mammu Groovy
Hilda Koronel as Mamu
Russell C. Mon as Ivan
Gerard Ramos
Stella Ruiz as Lalaine

Accolades

References

External links
 

2001 Philippine television series debuts
2007 Philippine television series endings
Filipino-language television shows
GMA Network original programming
Philippine comedy television series
Television series by M-Zet Productions